Marcel Roman (1900 – 21 June 1969) was a Belgian rower. He competed at the 1924 Summer Olympics in Paris with the men's coxed four where they were eliminated in the round one repechage. At the 1928 Summer Olympics in Amsterdam he was eliminated in the round one repechage with the men's eight.

References

1900 births
Year of death missing
Belgian male rowers
Olympic rowers of Belgium
Rowers at the 1924 Summer Olympics
Rowers at the 1928 Summer Olympics
European Rowing Championships medalists
20th-century Belgian people